Batara may refer to:

Batara, Nepal
Batara (bird), a monotypic bird genus containing only the giant antshrike
Batara (East Timor)
Savo Lazarević nicknamed Batara (1849—1943), Montenegrin and Yugoslav military officer